Bitter & Twisted may refer to:

 Bitter & Twisted (album), a 2000 album by Area-7
 Bitter & Twisted (film), a 2007 Australian film

See also
 Bitter Sweet & Twisted